The Northern Daily Leader, previously published as The Tamworth Daily Observer, The Daily Observer and The Tamworth Observer and Northern Advertiser, is a daily newspaper produced in the city of Tamworth, New South Wales, Australia. The paper publishes stories related to the Tamworth, New England and North West Slopes regions. It also publishes stories about state and national events. Its online website also publishes many of the stories featured in the newspaper.

History 
The newspaper began in 1876 as semi-weekly under the title The Tamworth Observer and Northern Advertiser published by George Hooke & Joseph Smith. In 1910 it changed its name to The Tamworth Daily Observer under the new publisher Albert Joseph for his company Tamworth Newspapers Co.. Joseph had struck a deal with G A Codrington, the proprietor of the competing newspaper Tamworth News, to form one daily newspaper. Under the agreement Codrington dissolved his paper and became managing director of The Tamworth Daily Observer. The paper underwent two more changes of title under Joseph's publication, first to The Daily Observer in 1917  and then to The Northern Daily Leader in 1921, which it remains today.

Distribution 
The Northern Daily Leader is distributed to the city and local region of Tamworth and the towns and villages of Quirindi, Walcha,  Manilla, Bingara, Barraba, Nundle, Murrurundi, Gunnedah, Uralla, Werris Creek, Caroona, Willow Tree, Wallabadah, Curlewis, Kootingal, Moonbi, Attunga, Carroll, Breeza, Currabubula, Sulcor, Bective, Somerton, Duri. It has a weekly readership of 35,929.

Ownership 
The paper is owned by Australian Community Media.

Digitisation
This newspaper has been partially digitised as part of the Australian Newspapers Digitisation Program project hosted by the National Library of Australia.

See also 
List of newspapers in Australia
List of newspapers in New South Wales

References

External links
 Northern Daily Leader
 Northern Daily Leader Rural Press Sales
 
 
 
 

Newspapers published in New South Wales
Tamworth, New South Wales
New England (New South Wales)
Fairfax Media
Daily newspapers published in Australia
Newspapers on Trove